Pultenaea arida is a species of flowering plant in the family Fabaceae and is endemic to the south of Western Australia. It is a low, spindly, spreading shrub with small, flat, hairy leaves and yellow, red or orange flowers.

Description
The flowers are yellow, red  or orange with spots and blotches of yellow, red or orange. Flowering occurs from September to December and the fruit is an oval pod.

Taxonomy and naming
Pultenaea arida was first formally described in 1904 by Ernst Georg Pritzel in the Botanische Jahrbücher für Systematik, Pflanzengeschichte und Pflanzengeographie. The specific epithet (arida) means "arid or dry".

Distribution and habitat
This pultenaea grows on flats in sandy or clay soils in the Coolgardie and Mallee biogeographic regions in the south of Western Australia.

Conservation status
Pultenaea arida is classified as "not threatened" by the Government of Western Australia Department of Parks and Wildlife.

References

arida
Eudicots of Western Australia
Taxa named by Ernst Pritzel
Plants described in 1904